MORC family CW-type zinc finger protein 3 is a protein that in humans is encoded by the MORC3 gene.

This gene encodes a protein that localizes to the nuclear matrix. The protein also has RNA binding activity, and has a predicted coiled-coil domain.

References

Further reading